Christopher Caluza (born July 3, 1990) is a retired Filipino-American figure skater. He is the 2013 Lombardia Trophy silver medalist, 2012 Bavarian Open bronze medalist, and the three-time Philippines national champion.

Career 
Caluza, who began skating on roller blades at age six, took up figure skating when he was seven following the roller rink's closure.

Caluza won the bronze medal at the 2012 Bavarian Open and at the same time earned the minimum score necessary to compete in an ISU Championships. He went on to place 12th at the 2012 Four Continents Championships and 21st at the 2012 World Championships.

The Philippines used the 2013 Four Continents to determine who would receive their sole men's spot at the 2013 World Championships. Caluza finished 14th, ahead of Michael Christian Martinez, and was sent to Worlds, where he finished 34th.

Personal life 
Caluza was born in Chula Vista, California. His parents are from the Philippines. He is a dual citizen of the United States and the Philippines. Caluza has studied business at Palomar College. He came out as gay to his closest friends and family in 2015 while he was still in college.

Programs

Competitive highlights

For the Philippines

For the United States

References

External links 

 

Filipino male single skaters
1990 births
Living people
Sportspeople from Chula Vista, California
American sportsmen
American sportspeople of Filipino descent
Competitors at the 2019 Southeast Asian Games
Southeast Asian Games silver medalists for the Philippines
Southeast Asian Games medalists in figure skating
LGBT figure skaters
Filipino LGBT sportspeople
Gay sportsmen
21st-century LGBT people